Chitinimonas lacunae is a Gram-negative and rod-shaped bacterium from the genus of Chitinimonas which has been isolated from an artificial pond in Korea.

References

Burkholderiaceae
Bacteria described in 2017